Roberto Calovi (born 26 March 1963) is an Italian former cyclist. He competed in the individual pursuit event at the 1984 Summer Olympics.

References

External links
 

1963 births
Living people
Italian male cyclists
Olympic cyclists of Italy
Cyclists at the 1984 Summer Olympics
Sportspeople from Trentino
Cyclists from Trentino-Alto Adige/Südtirol